The Brachyspira holin (B-Hol) Family (TC# 1.E.55) consists of several proteins from the GTA holin of Brachyspira hyodysenteriae (TC# 1.E.55.1.1), which facilitates gene transfer agent-release (see also GTA holin family) to VSH-1 holin of Brachyspira pilosicoli. VSH-1 is thought to participate in cell lysis. These proteins range in size from about 85 to 145 amino acyl residues (aas) and exhibit between 2 and 4 transmembrane segments (TMSs). A representative list of proteins belonging to the B-Hol family can be found in the Transporter Classification Database.

See also 
 Holin
 Lysin
 Transporter Classification Database

Further reading 
 Matson, Eric G.; Thompson, M. Greg; Humphrey, Samuel B.; Zuerner, Richard L.; Stanton, Thad B. (2005-09-01). "Identification of genes of VSH-1, a prophage-like gene transfer agent of Brachyspira hyodysenteriae". Journal of Bacteriology 187 (17): 5885–5892. . . . .
 Reddy, Bhaskara L.; Saier Jr., Milton H. (2013-11-01). "Topological and phylogenetic analyses of bacterial holin families and superfamilies". Biochimica et Biophysica Acta (BBA) - Biomembranes 1828 (11): 2654–2671. .  .  . 
 Saier, Milton H.; Reddy, Bhaskara L. (2015-01-01). "Holins in Bacteria, Eukaryotes, and Archaea: Multifunctional Xenologues with Potential Biotechnological and Biomedical Applications". Journal of Bacteriology 197(1): 7–17. .  .  .  . 
 Wang, I. N.; Smith, D. L.; Young, R. (2000-01-01). "Holins: the protein clocks of bacteriophage infections". Annual Review of Microbiology 54: 799–825. . .  .

References 

Protein families
Membrane proteins
Transmembrane proteins
Transmembrane transporters
Transport proteins
Integral membrane proteins
Holins